Enrico Golinucci (born 16 July 1991) is a Sammarinese footballer who plays as a midfielder for Folgore and the San Marino national team.

Career statistics

International

References

External links
 
 

1991 births
Living people
Sammarinese footballers
San Marino youth international footballers
San Marino under-21 international footballers
San Marino international footballers
Association football midfielders
F.C. Domagnano players
A.C. Libertas players
Campionato Sammarinese di Calcio players